Nehru Park or Children's Park, Paravur (also known as Paravur Municipal Park) is a public park situated at Paravur in Kollam Metropolitan Area, India. It is situated very close to Paravur railway station. Nehru Park is one of the main centres of recreational activities in Paravur town. Devarajan Master, most popular musician of Malayalam film industry(born in Paravur), was cremated at this park. A bronze statue of Devarajan Master sculpted by Kanayi Kunhiraman is there in the park. The compositions of Devarajan Master will be played in the park on every evenings.

Facilities
 Open air stage
 Television
 Fun rides for children
 Garden
 Audio broadcasting of Devarajan Master's compositions

Renovation
In 2014, Paravur Municipality renovated the park at a cost of Rs. 17 lakhs(US$26654.64) by facilitating sculptured compound wall, open air stage, new fun rides and an audio broadcasting facility for playing the compositions of Devarajan Master.

See also
 Paravur
 Paravur railway station
 Paravur Thekkumbhagam
 Pozhikara
 Estuaries of Paravur
 Paravur Puttingal Temple
 Nedungolam

References

Tourist attractions in Kollam district
Year of establishment missing
Parks in India